The Story of Esther Costello is a 1957 British drama film starring Joan Crawford, Rossano Brazzi, and Heather Sears. The film is an exposé of large-scale fundraising. The Story of Esther Costello was produced by David Miller and Jack Clayton, with Miller directing. The screenplay by Charles Kaufman was based on the 1952 novel by Nicholas Monsarrat. It was distributed by Columbia Pictures.

Plot 
With her marriage to womaniser Carlo Landi (Rossano Brazzi) in ashes, wealthy and childless Margaret Landi (Joan Crawford) finds an emotional outlet in patronizing a 15-year-old deaf, dumb, and blind Irish girl named Esther Costello (Heather Sears). Esther's disabilities are the result of a childhood trauma and are psychosomatic rather than physical. As Costello makes progress with Braille and sign language, she is seen as an example of triumph over adversity. Carlo gets wind of Margaret's new life and re-enters the scene. He views Esther as a source of cheap financial gain and arranges a series of exploitative tours for her under a mercenary manager Frank Wenzel (Ron Randell). One day when Margaret is absent from the Landi apartment, Carlo rapes the now 16-year-old Esther. The shock restores the girl's sight and hearing. When Margaret learns of her husband's business duplicities and the rape, she consigns Esther to the care of a priest and a young reporter who loves her (Lee Patterson). Margaret then kills Carlo and herself.

Cast

Production notes 
The film is based on a book by Nicholas Monsarrat that nearly had Helen Keller's co-workers suing for libel due to perceived parallels between Helen's story and Esther's. In particular, the book seemed to slur the character of Anne Sullivan's husband, writer-publicist John Macy, who was close to Keller's age. A relationship between Macy and Keller has long been a subject of speculation. Esther's reporter friend was reminiscent of Keller's highly publicised attempt to elope with reporter-secretary Peter Fagan.

The novel focuses mainly on the falsehoods behind large-scale charities and the self-serving natures of those involved. When Esther recovers her sight and hearing, her promoters worry that this will put an end to the Costello Fund. They convince her that the rape was her fault, and that to reveal that she is healed would bring shame and ruin to Margaret. She is actually coached to continue acting as deaf-blind, and does so for about a year; however, in that time she makes several slips (some deliberate). Esther's reporter friend discerns the truth and meets Esther privately, whereupon she tells him everything. He plans to write up the story, then take Esther away and marry her. But a few hours later, as he completes the story at the newspaper office, word comes to him that Esther has suddenly died. The official story is that she mistook a bottle of very strong sedatives for mild sleeping pills. When Harry confronts Margaret she reveals she knew of the meeting as he had left his handkerchief behind. She maintains she did not kill Esther, and continues the charade. The story can never be printed because Margaret and the charity managers command extreme wealth to fund a coverup. Even if the story were printed and people believed it, it would smear Esther's name and disillusion the people who believe in the Costello charity, and other, honest charities, and their message of hope. The novel closes with Margaret, robed in black, giving an impassioned speech at a convention, as millions of attendees open their wallets.

A key support role went to Ron Randell.

Reception

Box office 
The film was the 11th most popular film at the British box office in 1957.

According to Kinematograph Weekly the film was "in the money" at the British box office in 1957.

Critical 
The New York Times noted, "Miss Crawford, Mr. Brazzi, and Mr. Patterson and all the minor players are professional throughout." William K. Zinsser in the New York Herald Tribune wrote, "It wouldn't be a Joan Crawford picture without plenty of anguish...And her fans will have their usual good time...this plot enables Miss Crawford to run a full-course dinner of dramatic moods, from loneliness to mother love, from pride in the girl to passion with her husband, and finally to smouldering rage...Somehow she pulls it off. This may not be your kind of movie but it is many women's kind of movie and our Joan is queen of the art form."

DVD 
The Story of Esther Costello was released on DVD by Turner Classics (under license from Sony Pictures Home Entertainment) on 25 November 2014, as part of the "Joan Crawford in the 1950s" collection.

See also 
 List of American films of 1957
 List of films featuring the deaf and hard of hearing

References 
Citations

Works cited

External links 
 
 
 
 
Review of film at Variety

1957 films
1957 drama films
British drama films
British black-and-white films
Columbia Pictures films
1950s English-language films
Films based on British novels
Films directed by David Miller
Films about rape
Mariticide in fiction
Films about blind people
1950s British films